Tebogo Mokwena (born 25 May 1988) is a South African first class cricketer. He was included in the Griqualand West cricket team squad for the 2015 Africa T20 Cup.

References

External links
 

1988 births
Living people
South African cricketers
Griqualand West cricketers
Cricketers from Kimberley, Northern Cape